The Apiosporaceae are a family of fungi in the Ascomycota. It was placed in the order Amphisphaeriales in 2020.

The family was circumscribed in 1998. Species in the family are saprobic, and derive nutrients by decomposing and digesting plant matter, especially palms and grasses. Anamorph genera include Arthrinium and Cordella.

Genera
As accepted by Species Fungorum and Outline of Fungi 2020 (with amount of genera);
Apiospora  (102)
Appendicospora  (2)
Arthrinium  (73)

Cordella  (6)
Dictyoarthrinium  (6)

Nigrospora  (25)
Papularia  (5)
Phaeoharziella  (1)
Pseudobasidium  (1)

Rhinocephalum  (1) 

Spegazzinia  (17)

References

External links

Sordariomycetes
Amphisphaeriales
Ascomycota families

zh:暗色孢科